The Far Eastern Federal District is the largest of the eight federal districts of Russia but least populated, with a population of 8,371,257 (75.5% urban) according to the 2010 Census. The federal district lies entirely within the easternmost part of Asia and is coextensive with the Russian Far East.

History

The Far Eastern Federal District was established on May 18, 2000, by President Vladimir Putin and is currently being governed by presidential envoy Yury Trutnev. In November 2018, Buryatia and Zabaykalsky Krai were added to the federal district. The seat of the Far Eastern Federal District was moved from Khabarovsk to Vladivostok in December 2018.

Demographics

Federal subjects

Largest cities (with population over 75,000)
There are 82 cities in the Far Eastern Federal District, and 14 cities have populations over 75,000.

Only four of these 14 cities (Komsomolsk-on-Amur (6th) in Khabarovsk Krai, Ussuriysk (10th), Nakhodka (11th), Artyom (12th) in Primorsky Krai) are not administrative centres of a federal subject. Anadyr, the centre of Chukotka Autonomous Okrug, is one of the smallest centres of a federal subject (it has only 13,045 inhabitants). Only Magas, the centre of Ingushetia, is smaller than Anadyr.

Artyom is a large suburb of the Vladivostok metropolitan area.

Populations are given as of the 2010 Census:
Vladivostok: 592,034
Khabarovsk: 577,441
Ulan-Ude: 404,426
Chita: 324,444
Yakutsk: 269,601
Komsomolsk-on-Amur: 263,906
Blagoveshchensk: 214,309
Yuzhno-Sakhalinsk: 181,728
Petropavlovsk-Kamchatsky: 179,780
Ussuriysk:158,004
Nakhodka: 148,826
Artyom: 102,603
Magadan: 95,982
Birobidzhan: 75,413

Religion

According to a 2012 survey 27.4% of the population of the current federal subjects of the Far Eastern Federal District (including Buryatia and Zabaykalsky Krai) adheres to the Russian Orthodox Church, 5.0% are unaffiliated generic Christians, 1.4% is an Orthodox believer without belonging to any church or adheres to other (non-Russian) Orthodox churches, 3.3% is an adherant of Buddhism,  0.7% is an adherent of Islam, and 2.2% adhere to some native faith such as Rodnovery, Tengrism, Yellow shamanism, or Black shamanism. In addition, 27.0% of the population declares to be "spiritual but not religious", 23.5% is atheist, and 9.5% follows other religions or did not give an answer to the question.

Ethnicity

Ethnic composition, according to the 2010 census (before integration of Buryatia and Zabaykalsky Krai in 2018):

 In total - 6,293,129 people.
 Russians - 4 964 107 (78.88%)
 Yakuts - 469 897 (7.47%)
 Ukrainians - 154 954 (2.46%)
 Koreans - 56,973 (0.91%)
 Tatars - 40,003 (0.64%)
 Evenki - 27,030 (0.43%)
 Belarusians - 24 502 (0.39%)
 Evens (Lamuts) - 22,172 (0.35%)
 Uzbeks - 19,561 (0.31%)
 Armenians - 19,157 (0.30%)
 Azerbaijanis - 16 150 (0.26%)
 Chukchi - 15 396 (0.24%)
 Nanai - 11 784 (0.19%)
 Buryats - 10 942 (0.17%)
 Kyrgyz - 9562 (0.15%)
 Chinese - 8788 (0.14%)
 Mordva - 8618 (0.14%)
 Germans - 8141 (0.13%)
 Tajiks - 7891 (0.13%)
 Koryaks - 7723 (0.12%)
 Chuvash - 7402 (0.12%)
 Bashkirs - 6784 (0.11%)
 Moldovans - 6683 (0.11%)
 Kazakhs - 4687 (0.07%)
 Jews - 4626 (0.07%)
 Nivkhi - 4544 (0.07%)
 Itelmens - 3092 (0.05%)
 Mari - 2771 (0.04%)
 Ulchi - 2700 (0.04%)

Individuals who did not indicate nationality - 295,359 (4.69%)

Presidential plenipotentiary envoys to the Far Eastern Federal District
Konstantin Pulikovsky (18 May 2000 – 14 November 2005)
Kamil Iskhakov (14 November 2005 – 2 October 2007)
Oleg Safonov (30 November 2007 – 30 April 2009)
Viktor Ishayev (30 April 2009 – 30 August 2013)
Yury P. Trutnev (31 August 2013 – present)

See also 
 Far North (Russia)
 Far Eastern economic region
 Eastern Military District
 Far Eastern Republic
 Northeast China
 Outer Manchuria

References

External links 
 Meeting of Frontiers: Siberia, Alaska, and the American West (includes materials on Russian Far East) 
 Unofficial website of the Far Eastern Federal District 

 
Federal districts of Russia
Geography of Northeast Asia
Geography of the Russian Far East
States and territories established in 2000
2000 establishments in Russia